The South Side Weekly, previously known as the Chicago Weekly News and Chicago Weekly, is an American alternative newspaper based in Woodlawn on the South Side of Chicago. It was established in 1995 under the Chicago Weekly News title and covers arts, culture, and politics.

The paper is produced by an all-volunteer editorial staff, composed largely of University of Chicago students. The paper is distributed around the South Side each Wednesday in the fall, spring, and winter, with breaks during April and December. Over the summer, the Weekly publishes monthly, occasionally bi-monthly.

History
Known as Chicago Weekly News until closing operations in the winter of 2002, a newly branded Chicago Weekly resumed operations in 2003, as a result of a co-publishing partnership with university alumni-founded Newcity. Under this new partnership, a copy of Newcity would come inserted in the middle of each Chicago Weekly issue.

In 2013, the Chicago Weekly staff changed the name of the organization and newspaper to the South Side Weekly, and began publishing independently of Newcity.

Content
The paper covers arts and culture on the South Side of Chicago through coverage and criticism, and follows South Side news stories that are largely ignored by mainstream Chicago media. It includes feature-length narrative journalism, essays, and a weekly calendar of cultural events.

Special Issues 
The South Side Weekly produces an annual showcase issue of the South Side's various neighborhoods called Best of the South Side.

Each winter, the Weekly releases a housing guide. The issue features a variety of articles on topics including affordable housing, renter's rights, development, and homelessness.

Each spring, the Weekly releases an arts guide, featuring a print gallery comprising submitted art from South Side-based artists. Articles in this issue focus on arts coverage, both reviews and longform pieces.

References

External links
 South Side Weekly

Newspapers published in Chicago
Alternative weekly newspapers published in the United States
Publications established in 1995